Zhang Fusen (born March 1940 in Shunyi, Beijing) is a politician of the People's Republic of China.

Biography
He joined the Communist Party of China in 1958 and graduated from Tsinghua University in 1965.

Zhang was the Minister of Justice from December 2000 to July 2005. He was on the 14th, 15th, and 16th CPC Central Committee from 1992 to 2007.

External links
 Biography of Zhang Fusen, Xinhuanet

Living people
Ministers of Justice of the People's Republic of China
People's Republic of China politicians from Beijing
Chinese Communist Party politicians from Beijing
Year of birth missing (living people)